Mbayang Thiam (born 17 December 1982) is a Senegalese footballer who plays as a defender. She has been a member of the Senegal women's national team.

International career
Thiam capped for Senegal at senior level during the 2012 African Women's Championship.

References

1982 births
Living people
Women's association football defenders
Senegalese women's footballers
Senegal women's international footballers